Boom FM is a branding of classic hits radio stations broadcasting in Canada. The trademark is owned by Bell Media, although only two stations using the branding are owned by that company.

The name "Boom" is a reference to baby boomers, who are the main target of the network.

History
"Boom" was first launched on May 1, 2003 as a network of French-language oldies stations, and originally included CFEI-FM and CHRD-FM. CFVM-FM and CFZZ-FM joined the network in 2005 after these stations were acquired by Astral Media from Corus Entertainment. All four stations previously had an adult contemporary format. Since Astral Media already has two FM stations in each of Quebec's larger markets, it is impossible for them under current Canadian Radio-television and Telecommunications Commission (CRTC) regulations to launch Boom FM stations in these markets without dumping either the Énergie or the Rouge FM format, both of which are very successful according to Bureau of Broadcast Measurement (BBM) ratings.

On December 26, 2009, "Boom" added its first English-language affiliate, CHBM-FM in Toronto, Ontario, which flipped from its longtime adult contemporary EZ Rock format (as CJEZ-FM) to adult hits under the Boom 97.3 name. It was the only Boom FM station not using the classic hits format, though its logo uses the same lettering and 45 RPM plastic insert device as its Quebec counterparts. Owner Stingray Radio, however, currently markets the station's format as classic hits.

On June 30, 2011, "Boom" added its second English-language affiliate, CJOT-FM in Ottawa which flipped from the very same adult contemporary of the former CJEZ-FM Toronto as EZ Rock to the classic hits format as Boom 99.7. 

Following Bell Media's approval in 2013 to acquire Astral Media, a condition was placed in which that it must divest itself of several television services and radio stations, including CHBM and CJOT, which were placed in a blind trust pending its eventual sales. CJOT would be sold Corus Radio in March 2013, while CHBM was sold to Stingray Radio in August 2013. Corus' acquisition of CJOT-FM was approved on January 31, 2014, while Stingray's acquisition of CHBM-FM was approved on March 19, 2014. Despite differing ownership, both stations continue to use the Boom FM name and logo.

On August 25, 2014, Corus' CJSS-FM in Cornwall became the newest station in Ontario to be affiliated with the network.

In 2017, Stingray Radio gained permission from Bell Media to begin using the Boom brand and its content in Alberta. In July 2017, several of Stingray's rural Alberta stations took on the Boom format.

In May 2018, Boom 104.1 Saint-Jean-sur-Richelieu and Boom 106.5 Saint-Hyacinthe has changed to an adult contemporary format.

Stations

Former stations
 Amqui, Quebec - CFVM-FM (switched to RockDétente in 2008; now Rouge FM)
 Drummondville, Quebec - CHRD-FM (switched to RockDétente in 2009; now Rouge FM)

Unrealised station
CKSM AM 1220 of Shawinigan, Quebec was originally announced in April 2007 to have been a new affiliate of Boom, with plans to relocate the station to the FM band. However, the plans never materialised, and the station, which at the time was owned by Astral but rebroadcast then-Corus owned CHLN 550 AM of Trois-Rivières, closed down on June 30, 2007.

References

Bell Media
Radio formats
French-language radio in Canada
Canadian radio networks